Ashley Trevor Roestoff (born 27 August 1963) is a South African professional golfer. He played on the Sunshine Tour, where he found success, winning 10 tournaments between 1992 and 2002.

Roestoff was born in Johannesburg, and lives in Randburg with his wife, Letitia and his sons, Travis and Connor. He turned professional in 1987.  He attended Oral Roberts University in Tulsa, Oklahoma.

Roestoff joined the Sunshine Tour in 1992, and won his first title that same year at the Fish River Sun Classic. He has found most of his success on the Winter Swing of the tour where he has collected a total of 10 tournament victories.

In addition to the Sunshine Tour, Roestoff played one season on the second tier European Challenge Tour in 2001, finishing 26th on the final standings having picked up one win, at the Tusker Kenya Open.

Currently he is teaching at Parkview Golf Course and Jackal's Creek Golf Estate.

Amateur highlights
1987 Eastern Transvaal Team: Won all his single matches at the Interprovincial Championship.

Professional wins (12)

Sunshine Tour wins (10)
1992 (1) Fish River Sun Classic
1993 (1) Caribbean Estates West Coast Classic
1994 (1) Amatola Sun Claasic
1995 (2) ICL International, Lombard Tyres Classic
1996 (1) Trustbank Gauteng Classic
1998 (3) Fish River Sun Pro-Am, FNB Namibia Open, Vodacom Series: Eastern Cape
2002 (1) Vodacom Golf Classic

Challenge Tour wins (1)

Challenge Tour playoff record (1–0)

Other wins (1)
2009 Klipdrift Gold Sun International Touring Pro-Am (South Africa, non-Order of Merit event)

External links

South African male golfers
Oral Roberts Golden Eagles men's golfers
Sunshine Tour golfers
European Tour golfers
Golfers from Johannesburg
White South African people
1963 births
Living people